The General Pierce Bridge is a steel truss road bridge over the Connecticut River between Greenfield, Massachusetts and Montague, Massachusetts carrying Montague City Road.

As of summer 2021, the bridge is closed to vehicle traffic while undergoing major repairs. It remains open for foot traffic. It is scheduled to fully reopen in summer 2024.

Previous structures

The current bridge was preceded at that location by two bridges destroyed in the Flood of 1936. Upstream was the wooden double-decked covered bridge known as the Montague City Bridge, and carried rail traffic on top, with other traffic below. Next was the trolley bridge, which was a metal through-truss.

When the Flood of 1936 came, the trolley bridge was knocked off its piers and sunk into the river, where it remains.  The covered rail bridge floated down the river, where it knocked two spans off the New York, New Haven and Hartford Railroad Bridge (now known as the Canalside Rail Trail Bridge), then proceeded down the river to destroy the Sunderland Bridge.

See also 
List of crossings of the Connecticut River

External links and references
5.

https://www.constructionequipmentguide.com/northern-construction-service-to-preserve-renovate-restore-general-pierce-bridge/53398

Bridges over the Connecticut River
Montague, Massachusetts
Bridges completed in 1947
Bridges in Franklin County, Massachusetts
Road bridges in Massachusetts
Former toll bridges in Massachusetts